Gabriel Gascon (8 January 1927 – 30 May 2018) was a Canadian stage and film actor.

Born in Montreal, Quebec to parents Charles-Auguste Gascon and Marie-Rose Dubuc, Gascon began his acting career after joining the Compagnons de Saint-Laurent with the help of his elder brother Jean. Gascon established his career in France, where he met Andrée Lachapelle. He died on 30 May 2018, aged 91. 

He was also the brother of filmmaker Gilles Gascon.

Partial filmography

Étienne Brûlé gibier de potence (1952) - Janedo
Les Belles Histoires des pays d'en haut (1956–1963, TV Series) - Alexis Labranche
If I Were a Spy (1967)
The Aeronauts (1967, TV Series) - Louis Gagnon
The Return of Monte Cristo (1968) - Louis - le père de Linda
The Sergeant (1968) - Paul - Solange's Brother-in-Law (uncredited)
Les camisards (1972) - Capitaine Alexandre Poul
La Menace (1977) - Pannequin
The Suspended Vocation (1978) - Le père-confesseur
The Hypothesis of the Stolen Painting (1978) - Personnage des Tableaux
Lucien Brouillard (1983)
The Tin Flute (1983) - Cure
Sous les draps, les étoiles (1989)
Phantom Life (La vie fantôme) (1992) - Lautier
Cap Tourmente (1993) - Monsieur Simon
Matusalem (1993) - Captain Monbars
Mrs. Parker and the Vicious Circle (1994) - Georges Attends
Le silence des fusils (1996) - Pere Philbert
Cosmos (1996) - Crépuscule
Les mille merveilles de l'univers (1997) - Marshal Vega
Sucre amer (1998) - Le président
Nuremberg (2000, TV Mini-Series) - Großadmiral Erich Raeder
Possible Worlds (2000) - Kleber / Doctor
Marriages (2001) - Chanteur
Looking for Leonard (2002) - Martin
The Marsh (Le Marais) (2002)
Au fil de l'eau (2002) - Bernard
The Little Book of Revenge (2006) - Vendôme
Adam's Wall (2008) - Rabbi Levy
Mars and April (2012) - Arlequin (final film role)

References

External links

1927 births
2018 deaths
20th-century Canadian male actors
21st-century Canadian male actors
Canadian male film actors
Canadian male television actors
Canadian male stage actors
Male actors from Montreal
French Quebecers
Canadian expatriates in France
Canadian expatriate actors